A total lunar eclipse will take place on Sunday, April 25, 2032.

This lunar eclipse is first of a tetrad, four total lunar eclipses in series. The last series was in 2014 and 2015, starting with an April 2014 lunar eclipse. The next tetrad series is in 2043 and 2044, starting with a March 2043 lunar eclipse.

This is the 57th member of Lunar Saros 122. The previous event was the April 2014 lunar eclipse. The next event will be May 2050 lunar eclipse.

Visibility

Related lunar eclipses

Lunar year series

See also
List of lunar eclipses and List of 21st-century lunar eclipses

Notes

External links

2032-04
2032-04
2032 in science